The CIF San Diego Section (CIF-SDS) is the governing body of high school athletics for most of the two southernmost counties of California (San Diego and Imperial Counties), one of ten such sections that comprise the California Interscholastic Federation (CIF). Its membership includes most public and private high schools in San Diego and Imperial counties.

History
Official governance for high school sports in this area began in 1913, when the Southern California Interscholastic Athletic Council (SCIAC) was formed.  Previous to that, some individual leagues dated back to the 1890s.  The first local high school football game was played at Escondido High School against San Diego High School in 1898.  The High School Athletic Association of Southern California was formed in 1904 to create a championship in the sport of track and field, precipitating the need for administering all sports. In 1914, the name was changed to the Southern Section also releasing the acronym SCIAC which was taken locally by the Southern California Intercollegiate Athletic Conference the following year.  In 1917, the CIF took over administering sports statewide and the Southern Section became a part of it.  The Southern Section was a behemoth, the largest section covering the most populated southern half of the state.  In 1935, the Los Angeles Unified School District split from the section, forming their own CIF Los Angeles City Section.  In 1960, the San Diego Section was formed by carving out San Diego County, initially taking 32 schools.  In 2000, Imperial County split from Southern Section and joined with San Diego.  In 2013 the section began organizing playoff divisions based on team strength not school enrollment.  An Open division was created for the top 8 teams in most major sports.

Sports
CIFSD sponsors the sports listed below (divisions based on school size).

Fall Season
11-man Football (5 divisions plus an open division)
Cross country (5 divisions, girls and boys)
Field Hockey (2 divisions plus an open division)
Girls Volleyball (5 divisions plus an open division)
Girls Tennis (3 divisions)
Boys Water Polo (3 divisions)
Girls Golf

Winter Season
Basketball (Boys and Girls, 5 divisions plus an open division)
Roller Hockey (Co-ed, 1 division sanctioned by the Metro Conference with other non-Metro Conference High Schools as affiliate members)
Soccer (Boys and Girls, divisions plus an open division)
Girls Water Polo (3 divisions)
Wrestling (Boys, 3 divisions and Girls)

Spring Season
Badminton (3 divisions)
Baseball (5 divisions plus an open division)
Boys Golf
Gymnastics
Lacrosse (Boys and Girls, 2 divisions plus an open division)
Softball (5 divisions plus an open division)
Swimming and diving (Boys and Girls, 2 divisions)
Boys Tennis (2 divisions)
Track and Field (Boys and Girls, 2 divisions)
Boys Volleyball (4 divisions plus an open division)

Leagues

 Avocado East League
 Avocado West League
 Central League
 Citrus League
 Coastal League
 Desert League
 Eastern League
 Freelance League
 Freelance League
 Frontier - North 
 Frontier - South 
 Grossmont - Hills
 Grossmont - Valley
 Imperial Valley League
 Manzanita League
 Mesa League
 Metro League
 Pacific League
 Palomar League
 South Bay League
 Sunset League
 League League
 Western League

Playoff structure
Schools are grouped into divisions, the highest being the Open division.

Commissioners
 1960–76:  Don Clarkson
 1976–96:  Kendall Webb
 1996–01:  Jan Jessop
 2001–11:  Dennis Ackerman
 2011–20:  Jerry Schniepp
 2020–present: Joe Heinz

References

External links
CIF San Diego Section Website
CIF San Diego Section on MaxPreps

High school sports in California
Organizations based in California
Sports organizations established in 1960
High school sports associations in the United States
Sports governing bodies in the United States
California Interscholastic Federation sections
1960 establishments in California
Sports in San Diego